David Cianelli was a football player. He was drafted in the sixth round of the 1952 NFL Draft by the Dallas Texans.

Biography
Dave Cianelli was born in St. Cloud, Florida and served in the United States Marine Corps during the Second World War. After the war, he attended the University of Maryland, where he played football as a linebacker and fullback. In 1951, he was named an honorable mention All-American. Cianelli served as team co-captain alongside Bob Ward during the Terrapins' 1952 Sugar Bowl upset victory over "General" Neyland's number-one ranked Tennessee.

Cianelli later worked in Washington, D.C. as a lobbyist for Bethlehem Steel. After retiring  he lived in Allen, Texas.

Dave Cianelli died on April 12, 2017.

He is survived by five children, two sons and three daughters. His son, Dave Cianelli, is currently the Virginia Tech  track & field coach, and was named the 2007 ACC Coach of the Year for both indoor and outdoor track.

References

Year of birth missing
Maryland Terrapins football players
2017 deaths
Sportspeople from Greater Orlando
Sportspeople from Hagerstown, Maryland
People from St. Cloud, Florida
Players of American football from Florida
United States Marines
Bethlehem Steel people